Bradley Air Services Limited, operating as First Air, was an airline headquartered in Kanata, a suburb of Ottawa, Ontario, Canada. It operated services to 34 communities in Nunavut, Nunavik, and the Northwest Territories. First Air has assisted in various humanitarian missions such as the 2010 Haiti earthquake, airlifting relief supplies and equipment. Its main base, which included a large hangar, cargo and maintenance facility, was located at Ottawa Macdonald–Cartier International Airport, with hubs at Iqaluit Airport, and Yellowknife Airport. On November 1, 2019, the airline consolidated operations with Canadian North.

History 

The airline was founded by Canadian aviation pioneer Russel (Russ) Bradley and started operations as Bradley Air Services in 1946 and is still registered under that name. First Air started scheduled operations in 1973, between Ottawa and North Bay. This service was operated with an eight-seat passenger plane.

The airline opened southern gateways at Edmonton, Winnipeg, Montreal and Ottawa. Through Kuujjuaq in Nunavik and Yellowknife in the Northwest Territories (NWT), the airline provides services to 26 Inuit communities in Nunavut, Nunavik and the NWT. Service to Sanikiluaq, Nunavut is provided in partnership with Air Inuit.

In 1995, First Air acquired Ptarmigan Airways, and in 1997 Northwest Territorial Airways (also known as NWT Air), both merged into First Air. Ptarmigan Airways operated smaller turboprop aircraft types such as the Beechcraft King Air (BE-200 model), DHC-6 Twin Otter and Grumman Gulfstream I turboprops, and a single Cessna Citation II business jet aircraft.  At the time of the merger NWT Air operated Boeing 737-200 jetliners and a single Lockheed L-100 Hercules cargo turboprop.

First Air was wholly owned by the Inuit of Quebec through the Makivik Corporation, which purchased the company in 1990.

On 21 August 2008, First Air fired president Bob Davis and replaced him with Scott Bateman. Davis had been president since December 1997 and had several disagreements with First Air over a period of time.

On 5 June 2009, First Air received a wide-body aircraft, a Boeing 767-223 SF (Super Freighter), which was under a three-year dry lease from Cargo Aircraft Management (CAM), a subsidiary of Air Transport Services Group (ATSG). The 767 has since left the fleet.

After the introduction of the operationally and logistically more economical Boeing 767-223SF in March 2010, First Air retired and removed its two Boeing 727-233 aircraft from its fleet. One was one of only two combi types in the world, and the last 727-200 in North America on scheduled passenger-freight services. The other 727-233F full freighter has also been phased out. A Hawker Siddeley HS 748 turboprop (C-GFNW) was retired in March 2011. Replacing this aircraft type are two ATR 72 Combi turboprops as part of First Air's fleet replacement program. They are outfitted with a cargo handling system, and one is outfitted with a large cargo door. A first of its kind in North America, it is able to handle built Unit Load Device positions. This in turn will create a larger load capacity and flexibility reaching remote communities. One began service in the last quarter of 2011, and the second in the first quarter 2012.

In February 2011, First Air and Qikiqtaaluk Corporation (QC) started a new airline named Qikiqtani First Aviation. The new company provides services throughout Nunavut's Qikiqtani Region using First Air's fleet. Another airline, Sakku First Aviation, was started the same time in partnership with Sakku Investments Corporation in Nunavut's Kivalliq Region.

In December 2011, Scott Bateman, President and CEO, abruptly resigned his position with First Air. Kris Dolinki became president and CEO after Bateman's departure.

In October 2012, Dolinki resigned his position as president and CEO of First Air. This announcement came shortly after Makivik Corporation stated that, after many rumours, its stake in First Air was not for sale. The position of President and CEO was filled on an interim basis by Chris Ferris, First Air's Vice President of Marketing & Sales.

In March 2013, First Air/Makivik Corporation announced it had hired Brock Friesen as its new president and CEO.

On 11 April 2014, the Makivik Corporation and Norterra, owners of Canadian North, announced that they were in negotiations to merge the two airlines. According to a website set up the same day the new airline would be owned equally between the two companies and "a merger would create a stronger, more sustainable business, provide better service to customers and lead to new economic development opportunities across the North - "We believe the two companies would complement each other’s strengths." In October 2014, it was announced the merger would not go through, but First Air would still codeshare some flights with Canadian North.

In early 2015 First Air announced strategic agreements with Cargojet Airways and Summit Air. The 767 lease was transferred to Cargojet at that time and First Air is now providing ATR Turboprop services to Cargojet.

On 21 April 2015, First Air Hercules C-GUSI flew the final civilian L382 flight in Canada, bringing to an end over 45 years of commercial Lockheed Hercules service. L382 Hercules operations in Northern Canada were begun during the 1960s by Pacific Western Airlines.

 In 2016, First Air/Bradley Air Services became the oldest airline in Canada still operating under its original name.

On 28 September 2018, Makivik Corporation and the Inuvialuit Corporate Group (ICG) signed a definitive agreement to merge Canadian North and First Air, awaiting government approval. The new airline would use the new First Air livery, but would operate under the name "Canadian North". On 19 June 2019, the federal government gave approval to the merger provided several terms and conditions were met.

On 1 November 2019, First Air and Canadian North completed the merger and combined schedules. Operations are now under the Canadian North name using the First Air branding. However, full integration was expected to take 12 to 18 months.

Destinations 

First Air operates scheduled services to these domestic destinations in Canada:

According to the Official Airline Guide (OAG), First Air operated scheduled passenger service from the mid-1980s to the early 1990s nonstop between Ottawa (YOW) and Boston (BOS) primarily with Hawker Siddeley HS 748 turboprops but also with Boeing 727-100 Combi jetliners as well. This was the only scheduled passenger service ever operated to the U.S. by First Air.

Codeshare agreements
First Air has codeshare agreements with the following airlines:

 Air Greenland
 Air North
 Calm Air
 Canadian North (ended 16 May 2017)

Fleet
As of January 2022, Bradley Air Services had 31 aircraft registered with Transport Canada. All aircraft are operated as Canadian North

Retired fleet
First Air previously operated the following aircraft types:

 Boeing 727-100 (combi)
 Boeing 727-200 (combi and freighter)
 Boeing 737-200 (combi and freighter)
 Boeing 767-200 (freighter)
 de Havilland Canada DHC-6 Twin Otter (STOL capable aircraft)
 Douglas DC-3
 Hawker Siddeley HS 748 (combi) 
 Lockheed L-100 Hercules (freighter)
 ATR 72-202 (combi)

Accidents and incidents

Five of ten incidents had fatalities.

28 January 1974, a Douglas C-47B CF-TVK, a de Havilland Canada DHC-6 CF-DIJ, and de Havilland Canada DHC-3 CF-OHD of Bradley Air Services were destroyed in a hangar fire at Carp Airport, Ottawa.
23 August 1978, a de Havilland Canada DHC-6 C-FQDG of Bradley Air Services was destroyed on final approach to Frobisher Bay (now Iqaluit), Northwest Territories. One of two crew died and all four passengers survived.
29 August 1979, a de Havilland Canada DHC-6 C-GROW of Bradley Air Services was destroyed when plane crash on approach and short of the runway at Frobisher Bay (now Iqaluit), Northwest Territories. Two crew and seven  passengers perished in crash.
15 March 1981, a de Havilland Canada DHC-6 C-FDHT of Bradley Air Services sunk through polar ice near Nord, Greenland.
15 September 1988, a Hawker Siddeley HS 748 C-GFFA of Bradley Air Services was destroyed in a crash near Hammond, Ontario as it was approaching into Ottawa International Airport. Both crew on board perished.
12 January 1989, a Hawker Siddeley HS 748 C-GDOV of Bradley Air Services was destroyed in a crash near Dayton, Ohio killing both crew members.
12 August 1996, a de Havilland Canada DHC-6 C-GNDN of First Air was destroyed near Markham Bay, Northwest Territories. Both crew members perished.
3 December 1998, a Hawker Siddeley HS 748 C-FBNW of Bradley Air Services was damaged beyond repair while attempting take-off at Iqaluit, Northwest Territories. Crew of four and three passengers survived.
22 May 2001, a Boeing 737-210C C-GNWI of First Air was damaged beyond repair after landing in Yellowknife, Northwest Territories. All 98 passenger and 6 crew survived.
20 August 2011, Flight 6560, a First Air Boeing 737-210C (C-GNWN) flying a charter flight crashed en route from Yellowknife on final approach to Resolute, killing 12 and injuring 3 others.

See also
Above&Beyond
 List of defunct airlines of Canada

References

External links

First Air official website   (redirects to Canadian North)
Above&Beyond inflight magazine

Defunct airlines of Canada
Regional airlines of Ontario
Air Transport Association of Canada
Companies based in Ottawa
Regional airlines of the Northwest Territories
Regional airlines of Nunavut
Airlines established in 1946
Airlines disestablished in 2019
Regional airlines of Yukon
Inuit transport
Cargo airlines of Canada